Aedes bahamensis, also known as Howardina bahamensis, is a mosquito native to the Caribbean and Bahamas, which was first discovered in two counties of southern Florida in 1986,. The females of the species do not require a blood meal to produce eggs, although they will bite if starved of nectar or in order to produce a second brood. They are thought to be capable of transmitting St. Louis encephalitis.

References

bahamensis